Dual Unity is a live album by Annette Peacock and Paul Bley (credited as Annette & Paul Bley) which was released by Freedom Records in 1972.

Reception

Allmusic gave the album two stars, noting, "The madly in love combination of Paul Bley and Annette Peacock, toting all kinds of unstable synthesizer equipment around Europe, and backed by the madcap Han Bennink on drums, adds up to the stuff of musical legend. Sadly enough, this is one of the better musical documents from these encounters".

Track listing
All compositions by Annette Peacock and Paul Bley except as indicated
 "M.J." (Annette Peacock) - 17:22   
 "Gargantuan Encounter" - 4:36   
 "Richter Scale" - 8:12   
 "Dual Unity" - 3:22  
Recorded at Club B14 in Rotterdam, Netherlands on March 26, 1971 (tracks 1 & 2) and at Espace Cardin in Paris, France, on November 16, 1971 (tracks 3 & 4)

Personnel 
 Annette Peacock – bass guitar, electric piano, piano, vocals
 Paul Bley – electric piano, synthesizer
 Mario Pavone – double bass
 Han Bennink – drums (tracks 1 and 2)
 Laurence Cook – drums (tracks 3 and 4)

References 

1972 albums
Paul Bley albums
Annette Peacock albums
Freedom Records albums